The Revolution Radio Tour was a concert tour by American punk rock band Green Day in support of the group's twelfth studio album, Revolution Radio. The tour had 120 dates in North America, South America, Europe, Australia, and New Zealand from September 2016 through November 2017.

Overview 
The tour had eight legs. The first leg took place in North America from September to October 2016 in indoor theater venues. The second leg consisted of two shows in December 2016 in North America. The third leg took place in Europe in January and February 2017 in indoor arenas. The fourth leg of the tour took place in indoor arenas in North America from March to April 2017. The fifth leg took place in indoor arenas in Australia and New Zealand in April and May 2017. The sixth leg took place at music festivals, outdoor venues, and arenas in Europe in June and July 2017. The seventh leg took place in both indoor and outdoor venues in North America from August through September 2017. The eighth leg took place in November 2017 in Latin America.

Shows

Cancelled tour dates
 September 20, 2016 – The Pageant in St. Louis, United States (rescheduled to October 26, 2016)
 September 21, 2016 – Aragon Ballroom in Chicago, United States (rescheduled to October 23, 2016)
 September 23, 2016 – World Cup of Hockey Fan Village in Toronto, Canada (cancelled)
 September 24, 2016 – The Fillmore Detroit in Detroit, United States (rescheduled to October 24, 2016)
 June 21, 2017 – Slottsskogsvallen in Gothenburg, Sweden (venue moved to Scandinavium)
 July 4, 2017 – Bellahouston Park in Glasgow, United Kingdom (cancelled)
 September 8, 2017 – AT&T Center in San Antonio, United States (rescheduled to September 9, 2017)
 September 9, 2017 – Austin360 Amphitheater in Austin, Texas, United States (rescheduled to September 8, 2017)
 November 15, 2017 – Estadio Nacional in Lima, Peru (venue moved to Estadio Universidad San Marcos)
 November 15, 2017 – Estadio Universidad San Marcos in Lima, Peru (rescheduled to November 14, 2017)

Notes

Personnel
Green Day
 Billie Joe Armstrong – lead vocals, harmonica, lead and rhythm guitars
 Mike Dirnt – bass, backing vocals
 Tré Cool – drums, percussion, backing vocals on "King For A Day/Shout"
 Jason White – lead and rhythm guitars, backing vocals
Additional Musicians
 Jason Freese – keyboards, piano, saxophone, accordion, backing vocals
 Jeff Matika – rhythm guitar, acoustic guitar, backing vocals

Opening acts 
 Dog Party – all shows during leg one, except those in New York City
 Jesse Malin – Webster Hall show in New York City
 The Interrupters – all shows during leg three, leg five, and leg eight
 Against Me! – all shows during leg four
 Rancid – all shows during leg six
 Catfish and the Bottlemen – all shows during leg seven, except New York City show

Promotional performances 
In addition to tour dates, the band made promotional performances, including ones that were broadcast on radio, television, and the Internet.

 October 5, 2016 – The Howard Stern Show at Sirius XM Radio in New York City, United States
 October 6, 2016 – The Tonight Show Starring Jimmy Fallon at NBC Studios in New York City, United States
 October 14, 2016 – AT&T Live at the iHeartRadio Theater Los Angeles in Burbank, California, United States
 October 19, 2016 – Red Bull Sound Space at KROQ-FM in Los Angeles, United States
 November 6, 2016 – MTV Europe Music Awards at Rotterdam Ahoy in Rotterdam, the Netherlands
 November 20, 2016 – American Music Awards at the Microsoft Theater in Los Angeles, United States
 November 21, 2016 – Jimmy Kimmel Live! at the El Capitan Entertainment Centre in Los Angeles, United States
 November 22, 2016 – The Late Late Show with James Corden at CBS Television City in Los Angeles, United States
 December 13, 2016 – The Ellen DeGeneres Show at Warner Bros. Studios in Burbank, California, United States
 March 16, 2017 – The Late Show with Stephen Colbert at the Ed Sullivan Theater in New York City, United States
 May 19, 2017 – Good Morning America at the Summer Concert Series at Rumsey Playfield in New York City, United States
 September 5, 2017 – AmeriCares benefit live stream at the backstage of the MidFlorida Credit Union Amphitheatre in Tampa, Florida, United States
 September 19, 2017 – Radio station contest show at Hurley Studios, Costa Mesa, California, United States

Set list

This set list is representative of the performance on January 25, 2017 at Oslo Spektrum, Norway. It does not represent the set list at all concerts for the duration of the tour.

"Know Your Enemy"
"Bang Bang"
"Revolution Radio"
"Holiday"
"Letterbomb"
"Boulevard of Broken Dreams"
"Longview"
"Youngblood"
"2000 Light Years Away"
"Hitchin' a Ride"
"When I Come Around"

"Burnout"
"Waiting"
"Scattered"
"Minority"
"Are We the Waiting"
"St. Jimmy"
"Knowledge"
"Basket Case"
"She"
"King for a Day"

"Shout"
"Still Breathing"
"Forever Now"
First encore
"American Idiot"
"Jesus of Suburbia"
Second encore
"Ordinary World"
"Good Riddance (Time of Your Life)"

Songs performed 

1,000 Hours
"Only of You"

39/Smooth
"I Was There"
"Disappearing Boy"
"Going to Pasalacqua"

Slappy
"Paper Lanterns"
"Why Do You Want Him?"
"409 in Your Coffeemaker"
"Knowledge"

Kerplunk
"2,000 Light Years Away"
"One for the Razorbacks"
"Christie Road"
"Private Ale"
"Dominated Love Slave" (played partially)
"One of My Lies"
"80" (Partially played)

Dookie
"Burnout"
"Longview"
"Welcome to Paradise"
"Basket Case"
"She"
"When I Come Around"
"Coming Clean"
"F.O.D."

Insomniac
"Armatage Shanks"
"Brat"
"Stuck with Me"
"Geek Stink Breath"
"86"
"Stuart and the Ave."
"Brain Stew"
"Jaded"

Nimrod
"Nice Guys Finish Last"
"Hitchin' a Ride"
"Scattered"
"King for a Day"
"Good Riddance (Time of Your Life)"

Warning
"Waiting"
"Minority"

American Idiot
"American Idiot"
"Jesus of Suburbia"
"Holiday"
"Boulevard of Broken Dreams"
"Are We the Waiting"
"St. Jimmy"
"Give Me Novacaine"
"Letterbomb"
"Wake Me Up When September Ends"

21st Century Breakdown
"Know Your Enemy"
"Last Night on Earth"
"21 Guns"

¡Uno!
"Nuclear Family"

¡Dos!
"Amy" (played partially)

¡Tré!
"Walk Away" (played partially)

Revolution Radio
"Somewhere Now"
"Bang Bang"
"Revolution Radio"
"Say Goodbye" (Tease)
"Still Breathing"
"Youngblood"
"Too Dumb to Die"
"Troubled Times"
"Forever Now"
"Ordinary World"

Original non-album songs
"J.A.R."

Non-album cover songs
"Always Look on the Bright Side of Life" (played partially)
"Born to Die" (played partially)
"Break on Through (To the Other Side)" (played partially)
"Bump n' Grind" (played partially)
"Careless Whisper" (played partially)
"Danny Boy" (played partially)
"Deep in the Heart of Texas" (played partially)
"Do You Wanna Dance?" (played partially)
"Hey Jude" (played partially)
"(I Can't Get No) Satisfaction" (played partially)
"I Wanna Be Sedated" (played partially)
"Iron Man" (played partially)
"Johnny B. Goode"
"The Kids Are Alright" (played partially)
"Shout"
"Teenage Kicks" (played partially)
"Who Can It Be Now?" (played partially)

References 

2016 concert tours
2017 concert tours
Green Day concert tours
Concerts at Malmö Arena